Deh-e Asghar may refer to:
 Deh-e Asghar, Markazi
 Deh-e Asghar, Sistan and Baluchestan